David Israel Kertzer (born February 20, 1948) is an American anthropologist, historian, and academic, specializing in the political, demographic, and religious history of Italy. He is the Paul Dupee, Jr. University Professor of Social Science, Professor of Anthropology, and Professor of Italian Studies at Brown University. His book The Pope and Mussolini: The Secret History of Pius XI and the Rise of Fascism in Europe (2014) won the 2015 Pulitzer Prize for Biography or Autobiography. From July 1, 2006, to June 30, 2011, Kertzer served as Provost at Brown.

Biography
David Kertzer graduated from Brown University in 1969. He received his PhD in Anthropology from Brandeis University in 1974 and taught at Bowdoin College until 1992. That year he joined the faculty of Brown University as Professor of Anthropology and History. 

Sponsored by the U.S.-Italy Fulbright Commission, in 1978 he was Senior Lecturer at the University of Catania and in 2000, Chair at the University of Bologna. In 2001, he relinquished his post at Brown as Professor of History and was appointed Professor of Italian Studies. In 2005, he was elected a member of the American Academy of Arts and Sciences. From July 1, 2006, to June 30, 2011, Kertzer served as Provost at Brown.

Scholarship 
Kertzer is the author of numerous books and articles on politics and culture, European social history, anthropological demography, 19th-century Italian social history, contemporary Italian society and politics, and the history of Vatican relations with the Jews and the Italian state.  His book, The Kidnapping of Edgardo Mortara, was a finalist for the National Book Award in Nonfiction in 1997. 

His The Popes Against the Jews, published in 2001, was subsequently described as "one of the most critically acclaimed and contentious books of its genre and generation." The book analyzes the relation between the development of the Catholic Church and the growth of European anti-Semitism in the 19th and 20th centuries, arguing that the Vatican and several popes contributed actively to fertilizing the ideological ground that produced the Holocaust. The work produced intense discussion among scholars of European history and historians of the Catholic Church.

The follow-up work, The Pope and Mussolini: The Secret History of Pius XI and the Rise of Fascism in Europe (2014), examined documentary evidence from the Vatican archives, arguing that Pope Pius XI played a significant role in supporting the rise of Fascism and Benito Mussolini in Italy, but not of Nazi Germany. The book won the Pulitzer Prize for Biography or Autobiography in April 2015.

In 2020, after decades of pressure, the Vatican archives were finally opened, and David Kertzer was among the first historians to access them. At the time of the death of Pius XII, in 1958, all the documents of the pontificate were locked up: by preventing scholars from consulting them, many questions remained unanswered, making Eugenio Pacelli one of the most controversial popes in history. With the support of thousands of unpublished documents, in his 2022 book A Pope at War: the Secret History of Pius XII, Hitler, and Mussolini , Kertzer uncovered the existence of secret negotiations between Hitler and Pius XII already a few weeks after the end of the conclave. He also showed to what extent Mussolini relied on the Italian clergy and religious institutions to obtain popular support for entering the war, and how both Mussolini and Hitler managed to manipulate the Pontiff to their own advantage. Above all, Kertzer explains why, despite having irrefutable evidence of the ongoing extermination of the Jews, Pius XII never denounced the Nazi atrocities, as he preferred to abandon the role of moral guide, rather than put at risk continued existence of the Church.

Honors and awards
1969: Phi Beta Kappa, magna cum laude, Brown University
1972–1973: Woodrow Wilson Dissertation Fellow
1978: Fulbright Senior Lecturer, University of Catania, Italy, winter–spring
1982–1983: Fellowship, Center for Advanced Study in the Behavioral Sciences, Stanford
1986–1987: Guggenheim Fellowship
1995–1996: National Endowment for the Humanities Fellowship
Fall 1999: American Academy in Rome, Department of Education Professor
May–June 2000: Fellowship, Rockefeller Foundation Study Center, Bellagio, Italy
Spring 2000: Fulbright Chair, University of Bologna
2005: Elected Fellow, American Academy of Arts and Sciences
2015: Pulitzer Prize for Biography or Autobiography
2015–2016: Rome Prize for Modern Italian Studies

Book Awards 

1985: Marraro Prize (Society for Italian Historical Studies) for the best work on Italian history category in 1984 for Family Life in Central Italy.
1991: Marraro Prize (Society for Italian Historical Studies) for the best work on Italian history category in 1989 for Family, Political Economy, and Demographic Change.
1997: National Jewish Book Award in the Jewish-Christian Relations category for The Kidnapping of Edgardo Mortara

Finalists 

 1997: National Book Award for Nonfiction for The Kidnapping of Edgardo Mortara. 
 2002: Mark Lynton Prize for History for The Popes Against the Jews.

Written works
 Comrades and Christians: Religion and Political Struggle in Communist Italy. New York: Cambridge University Press, 1980
 Family Life in Central Italy, 1880–1910: Sharecropping, Wage Labor and Coresidence. New Brunswick: Rutgers University Press, 1984.
 Ritual, Politics and Power. New Haven: Yale University Press, 1988.
 Family, Political Economy, and Demographic Change: The Transformation of Life in Casalecchio, Italy, 1861–1921 (with Dennis Hogan). Madison: University of Wisconsin Press, 1989.
 Sacrificed for Honor: Italian Infant Abandonment and the Politics of Reproductive Control. Boston: Beacon Press, 1993
 Politics and Symbols: The Italian Communist Party and the Fall of Communism. New Haven: Yale University Press, 1996.
 The Kidnapping of Edgardo Mortara. New York: Knopf, 1997. 
 The Popes Against the Jews: The Vatican's Role in the Rise of Modern Anti-Semitism. New York: Knopf, 2001.
 Prisoner of the Vatican: The Pope's Plot to Capture Italy from the New Italian State. Boston: Houghton-Mifflin, 2004.
 Amalia's Tale: a Peasant's Fight for Justice in 19th Century Italy. Boston: Houghton-Mifflin, 2008.
 The Pope and Mussolini: The Secret History of Pius XI and the Rise of Fascism in Europe. Random House Publishing, 2014.
 The Pope Who Would Be King: The Exile of Pius IX and the Emergence of Modern Europe. Random House, April 24, 2018.

References

External links
 David Kertzer
 Interview to David I. Kertzer, on Mauxa.com
 

1948 births
Living people
American anthropologists
Jewish American historians
Brown University faculty
Christian and Jewish interfaith dialogue
Historians of the Catholic Church
Pulitzer Prize for Biography or Autobiography winners
Brown University alumni
Critics of the Catholic Church